The Lion Has Seven Heads  (original title:Der Leone Have Sept Cabeças) is a 1970 French-Italian-Brazilian film directed by Glauber Rocha. It was shot on location in Brazzaville, the Congo during the time Rocha was exiled.

Plot
In the late 1960s, a white preacher in Africa announces the world is due to end soon as he has captured an emissary of the devil. Rather than an emissary, the man is a Latin American revolutionary who supports the local liberation movement. The man escapes from the preacher and contacts a local liberation leader and offers him assistance in the local's fight against Imperialism.

Cast
 Rada Rassimov as Marlene
 Giulio Brogi as Pablo
 Gabriele Tinti as American Agent
 Jean-Pierre Léaud as Preacher
 Reinhard Kolldehoff as Governor
 Aldo Bixio as Mercenary
 Baiack as Zumbi
 Hugo Carvana as Portuguese
 Pascal N'Zonzi

Reception

References

External links
 

1970 drama films
1970 films
Brazilian drama films
French drama films
Italian drama films
Films directed by Glauber Rocha
1970s Portuguese-language films
1970s Italian films
1970s French films